USS Ted Stevens (DDG-128) is a planned  guided missile destroyer of the United States Navy, the 78th overall for the class. She will be named in honor of Ted Stevens who served as a U.S. Senator for Alaska for over 40 years. 
Stevens was a staunch supporter of both the Navy and the Marine Corps. Ted Stevens will be the third ship of the Flight III series.

References 

 

Arleigh Burke-class destroyers
Proposed ships of the United States Navy